Elizabeth Island may refer to:
 Elizabeth Island (Alaska)
 Elizabeth Island, Bahamas
 Elizabeth Island, Bermuda
 Elizabeth Island (Georgian Bay) 
 Elizabeth Island, Michigan
 Elizabeth Island, New Zealand
 Elizabeth Island (Victoria)
 Elizabeth Island (Cape Horn), possibly the same as Pactolus Bank
 A small cay rising above sea level at Elizabeth Reef in the Coral Sea Islands, Australia
 An early alternative name for Henderson Island (Pitcairn Islands)

Or may refer to the Elizabeth Islands chain in Massachusetts, USA